The inauguration of Gerald Ford as the 38th president of the United States was held on Friday, August 9, 1974, in the East Room of the White House in Washington, D.C., after President Richard Nixon resigned due to the Watergate scandal. The inauguration – the last non-scheduled, extraordinary inauguration to take place in the 20th century – marked the commencement of Gerald Ford's only term (a partial term of ) as president. Chief Justice Warren E. Burger administered the oath of office. The Bible upon which Ford recited the oath was held by his wife, Betty Ford, open to Proverbs 3:5–6.

Although this was the ninth, and most recent non-scheduled, extraordinary inauguration to take place since the presidency was established in 1789, it was the first to take place due to the president's resignation; the previous eight had been occasioned by the president's death in office. Ford had become vice president only eight months earlier, after Spiro Agnew resigned due to bribery allegations while serving as Baltimore County Executive and Governor of Maryland. He was the first vice president appointed as such under the terms of the Twenty-fifth Amendment. Thus, when he succeeded Nixon, Ford became the first (and remains the only) person to have held both the office of vice president and president without having been elected to either office.

Nixon's farewell

In a televised Oval Office speech on August 8, 1974, President Richard Nixon, who was facing impeachment proceedings for his role in the Watergate scandal and alleged cover-up, announced to the nation, "I shall resign the presidency effective at noon tomorrow [August 9]." At 9:00 the following morning, Nixon gave a farewell talk to an East Room assembly of White House staff and selected dignitaries, including the Cabinet and Vice President Ford. It was an emotional event, with President Nixon nearly breaking down multiple times. When it was finished, Vice President Ford escorted the President and First Lady to an Army helicopter, where the President waved his famous "V-sign" before flying off to Air Force One and a flight to "exile" in California. The nuclear codes were left with Ford.

Ford's swearing-in
Nixon's resignation was tendered to United States Secretary of State Henry Kissinger at 11:35 a.m. At that moment, Ford became the 38th president of the United States, although he took the official oath of office at 12:05 p.m. After the former president (and now private citizen)  Nixon left the building, the White House staff began preparations for President Ford's swearing-in. More chairs were added for the much larger crowd of invited guests than was at the farewell. The oath was administered to Ford by Chief Justice Warren E. Burger in the White House East Room. Chief Justice Burger was traveling in the Netherlands at the time, and was flown back to Washington, D.C., on an Air Force plane. The first phone call that Ford, a former center on the University of Michigan football team, made after his inauguration was on Saturday, August 10, 1974, to Ohio State University football coach Woody Hayes, who had just recently suffered a heart attack.

Remarks upon swearing-in
Immediately after taking the presidential oath, Ford gave a speech (authored by Counselor to the President Robert T. Hartmann) alluding in his remarks to the unique and "extraordinary circumstances" that led to his ascension to the presidency:

Immediately after the 850-word address was over, Ford introduced his new press secretary, Jerald terHorst, to the press corps, and met with the Cabinet.

Ford asked Henry Kissinger to stay on as Secretary of State in the new administration. Later that day, Ford met with ambassadors of the NATO nations.

References in popular culture

The May 20, 2015, series finale of the Late Show with David Letterman was introduced by archival footage of Ford's speech, and prerecorded cameos of former presidents George H. W. Bush, Bill Clinton, George W. Bush, and then-incumbent Barack Obama all saying, "our long national nightmare is over."

See also
Presidency of Gerald Ford
Timeline of the presidency of Gerald Ford
Watergate scandal

References

External links

Text of Remarks from Gerald Ford after taking the oath of office 
Audio of Ford's Remarks from Gerald Ford after taking the oath of office

Ford, Gerald R.
Presidency of Gerald Ford
1974 in American politics
1974 in Washington, D.C.
Watergate scandal
White House
August 1974 events in the United States